The Code Management Association [US-DE.BER:3031657] trading as the Electronic Code Management Association (ECCMA) is an international not for profit membership association founded in 1999 with mission to research, develop and promote better quality data for use in electronic commerce. 

The Association first developed the United Nations Standard Products and Services Code (UNSPSC) as a global commodity classification and went on to develop the ECCMA Open Technical Dictionary (eOTD). These initiatives allowed the creation and exchange of unambiguous, language independent master data, data that identifies and describes individuals, organizations, locations, goods, services, processes, rules and regulations. The eOTD is based on the Federal Cataloging System and the NATO Codification System, the systems used to manage the world’s largest shared inventory developed by the Department of Defense and members of NATO and used today in over 50 countries.

ECCMA is the project leader for ISO 22745 (Open technical dictionaries and their application to master data) and ISO 8000 (Data quality). 

ECCMA is the American National Standards Institute (ANSI) accredited administrator of the US technical advisory group (US TAG) to ISO Technical Committee 184 Sub Committee 4 (ISO TC 184/SC 4), a leading ISO technical committee responsible for the development and maintenance of international standards for industrial data.

ECCMA is a Type A Liaison organization to ISO TC 184/SC 4.
ECCMA provides its members with ISO 8000 Digital Supply Chain Solutions:

ECCMA provides its members with ISO 8000 Digital Supply Chain Solutions:

 Data governance and data quality training, ISO 8000 certification, and consulting 
 Back office Master Data Quality Control (MDQC)
 On-line applications:
 ECCMA Data Dictionary Manager (eDDM)
 ECCMA Smart Catalog Builder (eSCB)
 ECCMA Master Data Validator (eMDV)

 APIs:
 eOTD (dictionary)
 eDRR (cataloging templates)
 ePNS (manufacturer short names)
 eSOM (shared organization master containing 100+ thousand verified records)
 eSMM (shared material master containing 6+ million records)

 Research:
 Multilingual data dictionaries, taxonomies, classifications, cataloging templates
 Supplier and customer legal name verification, including duplicate identification
 Material master research and verification, including duplicate identification

References

External links 
 ANSI
 ECCMA
 SC4ONLINE

Non-profit organizations based in Pennsylvania
Organizations established in 1999
1999 establishments in Pennsylvania